John Webb (1754–1828) was an English landscape designer, who also trained as an architect.  He studied under William Emes between 1782 and 1793, and then established his own practice.  He worked mainly in the Midlands and the north of England.  In Staffordshire he was commissioned by Josiah Wedgwood to work in the gardens of Lowther Hall and Maer Hall.  In Cheshire he designed work in the gardens of Rode Hall, Tabley House, Crewe Hall, Tatton Park, and Ardene Hall. He followed Emes at Eaton Hall where he added new terrace walls, improved one of the approach roads by levelling it and planting 130,000 trees along it, and built a lake in the grounds.

References
Citations

Sources

External links
Country houses by John Webb – The DiCamillo Companion

1754 births
1828 deaths
English gardeners
English landscape architects
Landscape or garden designers